Edward Mavskegg, known professionally as Mavskegg and previously as Edward 209, is a Ukrainian music video director and artist. His videos and images are works for pop, electro, rock, pop-rock, alternative, ebm, industrial and other music genres. Mavskegg directed music videos for In Strict Confidence, Paradise Lost, Implant featuring Jean-Luc De Meyer of FRONT 242, Attrition, Hocico, and Björk Innocence competition.

Film (selection) 
Director
 Celeste Kennicot (2016)
 The Cleopatrium: That Rules (2016 Short film)
 Deposit for the Courier (2014 Short film)
 Day of worker (2008 Short film)
 Sugar garden secret (2007 Short film)
 The ball (2006 Short film)

Music videos (selection) 
Director
 2012 Bending and floating, Collide 
 2012 Shades of Grey, Ophelia Syndrome
 2012 In the frequency, Collide
 2011 Otra Noche En La Viruta, Otros Aires 
 2007 Drowning, Hocico
 2007 Innocence (comp.), Björk
 2007 The Enemy, Paradise Lost 
 2006 The Creature, Implant featuring Jean-Luc De Meyer of Front 242
 2006 Heal Me, In Strict Confidence
 2006 Brave New World, Technology
 2005 A Girl Called Harmony, Attrition 
 2004 Seven Lives, In Strict Confidence

Awards (selection) 
 2015 Atlas Awards, Best Animation, film "Deposit For The Courier".Boston, MA. U.S.A 
 2014 TOFF film festival . Official Selection, film "Deposit For The Courier".
 2011 BBC Music Video Festival, Otra Noche En La Viruta for Otros Aires was included in ‘Best Europe’ . Greenwich, U.K., 
 2006 Open Cinema International Short and Animation Film Festival. Saint Petersburg.RU.Special Merit Award for Music Video "Heal Me",(In Strict Confidence)
 2006 Open Cinema International Short and Animation Film Festival. Saint Petersburg.RU.Nomination for Best Video Art: "The Creature" (Implant featuring Jean-Luc De Meyer of Front 242)

References

External links 
 mavskegg.com
 Deposit For The Courier on IMDb
 The Cleopatrium : That Rules on IMDb
 Celeste Kennicot on IMDb

Ukrainian film directors
Ukrainian music video directors
Living people
Year of birth missing (living people)